The Italian regional elections of 1959 were regional elections held in Aosta Valley and Sicily on 17 May and 7 June. This was the third regional election in Aosta Valley and the fourth in Sicily.

Result

Aosta Valley

Sources: Regional Council of Aosta Valley and Istituto Cattaneo

Sicily

Sources: Istituto Cattaneo and Sicilian Regional Assembly

References

Elections in Italian regions
1959 elections in Italy